Live at the Fairfield Halls, 1974 is a live album by Caravan. It remained unreleased in the UK until 2002, though most of the set was issued as a double vinyl LP in France and Germany called The Best of Caravan "Live" in 1980. This issue is now very rare and was only available for 3 years. This live set happened to be the first time Mike Wedgwood had played bass for the band.

Track listing

"Memory Lain, Hugh / Headloss" – 9:27
"Virgin on the Ridiculous" – 7:14
"Be Alright / Chance of a Lifetime"  – 6:37
"The Love in Your Eye" – 15:23
"L'Auberge Du Sanglier / A Hunting We Shall Go / Pengola / Backwards / A Hunting We Shall Go (Reprise)" – 9:49
"The Dog the Dog He's at It Again" – 6:23
"For Richard" – 19:01
"Hoedown" – 5:58

Personnel
Caravan
 Pye Hastings – guitar, lead vocals
 David Sinclair – Hammond organ, electric piano, synthesizer
 Geoffrey Richardson – viola
 Mike Wedgwood – bass, backing vocals
 Richard Coughlan – drums

References

External links
 Caravan - Live at the Fairfield Halls, 1974 album review by Lindsay Planer, credits & releases at AllMusic.com
 Caravan - Live at the Fairfield Halls, 1974 album releases & credits at Discogs.com
 Caravan - Live at the Fairfield Halls, 1974 album credits & user reviews at ProgArchives.com
 Caravan - Live at the Fairfield Halls, 1974 album to be listened as stream at Play.Spotify.com

Caravan (band) live albums
2002 live albums
Albums produced by Dave Hitchcock
Decca Records live albums